Kutluguza (Qotloğuja) is a Russian village in Belsky Selsoviet, Gafuriysky District, Bashkortostan, Russia. The population was 314 as of 2010. There are nine streets.

Geography 
Kutluguza is located 22 km southwest of Krasnousolsky (the district's administrative centre) by road. Novokaramyshevo is the nearest rural locality.

References 

Rural localities in Gafuriysky District